DXSN (92.7 FM), broadcasting as 92.7 Radyo Pilipinas, is a radio station owned by Iddes Broadcast Group. Its studio is located at the 2nd floor, Dela Rosa Bldg., Purok 2-B, Brgy. 1, San Francisco, Agusan del Sur. 
Despite the station's current branding, it is not to be confused with the state-run Philippine Broadcasting Service's radio network of the same name.

References

Radio stations in Agusan del Sur